Anolis tropidonotus, the greater scaly anole, is a species of lizard in the family Dactyloidae. The species is found in Mexico.

References

Anoles
Reptiles described in 1863
Endemic reptiles of Mexico
Taxa named by Wilhelm Peters